Lake Priyadarshini is a freshwater lake in the Schirmacher Oasis, Antarctica. It supplies water for Maitri, India's second permanent station in Antarctica. Lake Priyadarshini was named after the then Prime Minister of India Indira Priyadarshini Gandhi.

Sanskrit priyadarshinī प्रियदर्शिनी is the feminine form of priyadarshina प्रियदर्शिन, meaning "looking with kindness upon everything".

References

External links
 Thermal Structure, Sedimentology, and Hydro-geochemistry of Lake Priyadarshini, Schirmacher Oasis, Antarctica, by R. Sinha and Asim Chatterjee

Lakes of Queen Maud Land
Princess Astrid Coast
Lakes of Antarctica